Lake County Courthouse located in Painesville, Ohio was designed in an eclectic Beaux-Arts style by Cleveland architect J. Milton Dyer. It was completed in 1909.

Dyer, a well known Cleveland, Ohio architect had previously collaborated with Cleveland sculptor Herman Matzen on the Summit County Courthouse (Ohio), located in Akron, Ohio, in 1906.  For the Lake County Courthouse Matzen produced evocative figures of Cain and Abel.

References

County courthouses in Ohio
Government buildings completed in 1909